Paul Dresse (24 September 1901 – 4 February 1987) was a Belgian writer. His work was part of the literature event in the art competition at the 1936 Summer Olympics.

References

1901 births
1987 deaths
20th-century Belgian male writers
Olympic competitors in art competitions
Writers from Liège